Samuel Smith (S.S.) Nicholas (1796 - November 27, 1869) was a jurist in the state of Kentucky and an author of law essays.

Nicholas started his career as a merchant in New Orleans. He studied law and moved to Kentucky, where he became a judge of the Court of Appeals.  He was also known for his assistance in compiling the 1852 revised code of Kentucky.

During his tenure, Nicholas wrote the following works:
 Conservative Essays, Legal and Political
 Martial Law
 A Review of the Argument of President Lincoln and Attorney General Bates, in Favor of Presidential Power to Suspend the Privilege of the Writ of Habeas Corpus
 South Carolina, Disunion, and a Mississippi Valley Confederacy
 Habeas Corpus, The Law of War, and Confiscation

Judge Willard Saulsbury, Sr. quoted the works of Nicholas in his speech on the resolution proposing to expel Jesse D. Bright, and said "...we all know that since the commencement of this struggle no man has written or spoken more earnestly than has Chancellor Nicholas, of Kentucky..."

References

1796 births
1869 deaths
Presidents of the University of Louisville
Judges of the Kentucky Court of Appeals
American legal writers
19th-century American writers
19th-century American judges